Harold Lacy Landers (June 28, 1927 – August 20, 2011) was an American politician. He was a member of the Arkansas House of Representatives, serving from 1963 to 1994. He was a member of the Democratic Party.

In 1987 he hosted the Southern Legislative Conference in Little Rock, Arkansas. A 2012 House Resolution commemorated him.

References

2011 deaths
1927 births
20th-century American politicians
People from Benton, Arkansas
Speakers of the Arkansas House of Representatives
Democratic Party members of the Arkansas House of Representatives